Mario Johnson (born 16 July 2002) is a Bahamian footballer who plays for IMG Academy and the Bahamian Men's National Football Team. Mario is the youngest Bahamian in history to start a professional match for The Bahamas in a CONCACAF Nations League game against Belize where he had 7 saves including a penalty save.

International career
Johnson made his senior national debut on 7 September 2018 in an away defeat to Belize in CONCACAF Nations League qualifying.

References

External links

2002 births
Living people
Bahamian footballers
Bahamas international footballers
Association football goalkeepers